Three Dead Trolls in a Baggie (aka 'The Trolls') was a Canadian comedy group from Edmonton, Alberta formed in 1987. Their credits include numerous stage productions, a television show and five albums.

The Trolls did sketch comedy, often on risqué or controversial subjects, along with humorous songs. One of their songs, "The Toronto Song" (which is often incorrectly attributed to The Arrogant Worms), makes fun of Canada's regional rivalries by insulting the city of Toronto and eventually most of the rest of the country.  The Trolls also composed musical parodies of historical events such as the War of 1812, and Canada's 1999 division of Nunavut from the Northwest Territories; the song "Nunavut" opens with "We'll keep Canada... and you can have Nunavut!" (pronouncing it "None-of-it").

History
Childhood friends Wes Borg and musician and actor Joe Bird met actress Cathleen Rootsaert at a Rapid Fire Theatre Theatresports comedy jam and formed the group. Neil Grahn was recruited later. Their name allegedly came from a restaurant which called hamburgers-to-go "Three Dead Trolls in a Baggie". They immediately began performing and, by 1991, were touring with a play they called Kevin Costner's Naked Butt. They caught the attention of CBC Television, which gave them a show but it was canceled after five episodes. 

Also in 1992, they released their debut album, Con Troupo Comedius.

In 1993, the CBC paid the group $60,000 to write 10 scripts for a possible new show. The network then rejected the scripts. In April 1994, The Trolls produced the scripts, turning the stage at the Roxy Theatre (Edmonton) into a replica of a real CBC studio.

Rootsaert and Grahn left the group;  Borg and Bird joined Atomic Improv began collaborating with other Edmonton musicians and comedians, getting heavily into Improvisational theatre (improv). 

In 1995, The Trolls performed with the band Jr. Gone Wild at the Garneau Theatre in Edmonton and released the album Jr. Gone Wild & Three Dead Trolls In A Baggie – Live At The Hyperbole.

In 2000, they collaborated with the Cross-dressing comedy troupe Guys in Disguise on the scripted play Piledriver, which was about a group of gay wrestlers on tour through the Bible Belt in the 1970s. Their play The War of 1812, a humorous retelling of the war of the same name replete with deliberately over-the-top pro-Canadian jingoism, produced another of the group's most famous song, "The White House Burned (The War of 1812)". As a result of this production, comedy writer Paul Mather joined the group.

Grahn returned and he and Borg hosted The Geek Show  which aired on Canadian Learning Television, BookTV and Access in 2004-2005.

By 2005, the group had broken up. Borg moved to Victoria, British Columbia in 2007 and became a fixture in that city's entertainment scene. Mather moved to Toronto and wrote for Corner Gas, Little Mosque on the Prairie and the Rick Mercer Report. Rootsaert is an actor and director; Grahn is a writer and producer.

On April 1, 2009, Joe Bird died of a heart attack, at age 41. His life was celebrated annually at the Empress Pub in Edmonton, until it closed in 2020. Joe's songs are much loved by the Edmonton community, and musicians are working to ensure these songs are remembered.

Discography

Con Troupo Comedius, 1992, Independent
Jr. Gone Wild & Three Dead Trolls In A Baggie – Live At The Hyperbole, 1995, Stony Plain Music
Steaming Pile of Skit, 2001, Independent
The Geek Album 2.0, 2002, Independent
Skit Happens, 2003, Independent

References

Musical groups with year of establishment missing
Musical groups from Edmonton
Canadian comedy musical groups
Comedy collectives